The history of Italians in Baltimore dates back to the mid-19th century. The city's Italian-American community is centered in the neighborhood of Little Italy.

Demographics

In 1920, 7,930 foreign-born white people in Baltimore spoke the Italian language.

In 1940, 8,063 immigrants from Italy lived in Baltimore. These immigrants comprised 13.2% of the city's foreign-born white population. In total, 18,179 people of Italian birth or descent lived in the city, comprising 13% of the foreign-stock white population.

In the 1960 United States Census, Italian-Americans comprised 71% of the foreign-stock white population in Little Italy, Baltimore's tract 3–2.

The Italian community in the Baltimore metropolitan area numbered 157,498 as of 2000, making up 6.2% of the area's population. In the same year Baltimore city's Italian population was 18,492, 2.8% of the city's population.

In 2013, an estimated 16,581 Italian-Americans resided in Baltimore city, 2.7% of the population.

In September 2014, immigrants from Italy were the thirty-sixth largest foreign-born population in Baltimore.

History

Italians began to settle in Baltimore during the late 1800s. Some Italians immigrants came to the Port of Baltimore by boat. The earliest Italian settlers in Baltimore were sailors from Genoa, the capital city of the Italian region of Liguria, who arrived during the 1840s and 1850s. Later immigrants came from Naples, Abruzzo, Cefalù, and Palermo. These immigrants created the monument to Christopher Columbus in Druid Hill Park. Many other Italians came by train after entering the country through New York City's Ellis Island. Italian immigrants who arrived by train would enter the city through the President Street Station. Because of this, Italians largely settled in a nearby neighborhood that is now known as Little Italy.

Little Italy comprises 6 blocks bounded by Pratt Street to the North, the Inner Harbor to the South, Eden Street to the East, and President Street to the West. Other neighborhoods where large numbers of Italians settled include Lexington, Belair-Edison, and Cross Street. Many settled along Lombard Street, which was named after the Italian town of Guardia Lombardi. The Italian community, overwhelmingly Roman Catholic, established a number of Italian-American parishes such as St. Leo's Church and Our Lady of Pompeii Church. The Our Lady of Pompeii Church holds the annual Highlandtown Wine Festival, which celebrates Italian-American culture and benefits the Highlandtown community association.

The August 2016 Central Italy earthquake affected Baltimore's Italian community, as many Baltimore Italian-Americans have friends or relatives living in Italy. Most Italians in Baltimore are of Southern or Central Italian descent, especially from Abruzzo, a region of Southern Italy close to the epicenter of the earthquake. St. Leo the Great Catholic Church in Little Italy held a vigil and sent prayers to the victims and survivors of the earthquake.

Notable Italian-Americans from Baltimore

Rafael Alvarez, an author based in Baltimore and Los Angeles.
Frank Battaglia, a former Baltimore Police Department officer who was Commissioner of the Department.
Steve Bisciotti, the majority owner of the Baltimore Ravens.
Charles Bonaparte, a lawyer and political activist for progressive and liberal causes.
Gary D'Addario, a retired police commander, television technical advisor and actor.
Thomas D'Alesandro, Jr., a politician who was a U.S. Representative from Maryland's 3rd congressional district and subsequently the mayor of Baltimore, Maryland. He was the father of former House Speaker Nancy Pelosi and former Baltimore Mayor Thomas L. J. D'Alesandro III.
Thomas L. J. D'Alesandro III, an attorney and former politician who served as Mayor of Baltimore. He is the brother of former House Speaker Nancy Pelosi and son of former Baltimore Mayor Thomas D'Alesandro, Jr.
Joe Dundee, a boxer, World Welterweight Champion, and brother of Middleweight Champion Vince Dundee.
Vince Dundee, the former New York State middleweight champion of the world.
Cipriano Ferrandini, an immigrant from Corsica and long-time barber/hairdresser at Barnum's Hotel in Baltimore.
Victor Galeone, the Bishop Emeritus of St. Augustine, Florida.
Harry Jeffra, a former world bantamweight and NYSAC featherweight boxing champion.
Kevin Levrone, a former IFBB professional bodybuilder, IFBB Hall of Famer, blogger, musician and actor.
Joey Maggs, a professional wrestler better known by the ring name "Jumping" Joey Maggs.
Samuel J. Palmisano, the former president and chief executive officer of IBM.
Vincent Luke Palmisano, a politician who served as a member of the Maryland House of Delegates and as a member of the Baltimore City Council.
Nancy Pelosi, the 60th Speaker of the United States House of Representatives.
Santino Quaranta, a former soccer player.
Frank Zappa, a musician, bandleader, songwriter, composer, recording engineer, record producer, and film director.

Fictional Italian-Americans from Baltimore

Tommy Carcetti, a fictional character on the HBO drama The Wire.
Steve Crosetti, a fictional character on the television drama series Homicide: Life on the Street.
Paul Falsone, a fictional police detective of the Baltimore Police Department on Homicide: Life on the Street.
Al Giardello, a fictional character from the television drama Homicide: Life on the Street.
Mike Giardello, a fictional character from the television drama Homicide: Life on the Street.
Anthony DiNozzo, a fictional character and protagonist from the CBS TV series NCIS.
Salvatore Romano, a fictional character on the AMC drama Mad Men.

See also

Ethnic groups in Baltimore
History of Baltimore

References

Further reading

 Baucia, Camillo. "La colonia Italiana di Baltimore, Maryland", New York : Societa Tipografica Italiana, 1932.
 Molino, Suzanna Rosa. "Baltimore's little italy : heritage and history of the neighborhood", History Pr Ltd, 2015.
 Reilly, Sara Jean. "The Italian immigrants, 1920-1930 : a case Study in Baltimore", M.A. Johns Hopkins University, 1962.
 Sandler, Gilbert. "The neighborhood; the story of Baltimore's Little Italy", Baltimore, Bodine, 1974.
 Scarpaci, J. Vincenza. "Ambiento Italiano : origins and growth of Baltimore's Little Italy", Genève : Droz, 1981.
 Shufelt, Gordon H. "Strangers in a middle land : Italian immigrants and race relations in Baltimore, 1890-1920", Ph. D. American University, 1998.
 Torrieri, Nancy Karen. "Residential dispersal and the survival of the Italian community in metropolitan Baltimore, 1920-1980", Ph. D. University of Maryland, 1982.
 Zehren, Maria A. ""The dangling scissors" : marriage, family and work among Italian women in the clothing industry in Baltimore, 1890-1920", Ph. D. Georgetown University, 1998.

External links

Little Italy in Baltimore
Percentage of Italians in Baltimore, MD by Zip Code

Italian
 
Baltimore
Baltimore